Hacked Vol. 2 is a remix album by SMP, released on May 9, 2016 by Music Ration Entertainment. The collection comprises eight previously unreleased remixes, one out-of-print remix, three instrumentals and nine remixes that appeared on the band's 2002 album Hacked.

Track listing

Personnel
Adapted from the Hacked Vol. 2 liner notes.

SMP
 Jason Bazinet – lead vocals, instruments
 Sean Ivy – lead vocals, instruments

Production and design
 Bethany Antikajian – backing vocals (13), Jeremy Moss (5, 10, 16)
 Steph Dumais – design
 Heather Ivy – cover art, illustrations
 The Sultan – design

Release history

References

External links 
 Hacked Vol. 2 at iTunes
 Hacked Vol. 2 at Discogs (list of releases)

2016 remix albums
SMP (band) albums